Chambres en ville (Rooms in town) was a Québécois téléroman written by Sylvie Payette that aired on TVA from 1989 to 1996.

Plot
This is the story of flatmates living in a dormitory. Louise is one of the central character in this series along with Rodrigue "Pete" Béliveau. Louise welcomes students into her residence and ends up taking on different roles for her guests: a mother, nurse, listener, psychologist, and probation agent among others. The students develop a close relationship with her and most of them keep coming back each year. Even after they depart, Louise is always available for them. Through different students' experiences, we are witness to all sorts of wild and turbulent events. Some of the subjects raised include; wars between roommates, sex (often during action), sickness (AIDS) and cheating, all of which make for an interesting soap opera (téléroman).

Cast

 Francis Reddy : Rodrigue "Pete" Béliveau
 Vincent Graton : Gabriel Lévesque
 Pascale Bussières : Marie Vincent
 Michel Charette : Samuel
 Gregory Charles : Julien Philippe
 Marie-Josée Croze : Noémie Vanasse
 Isabelle Cyr : Hélène Cyr
 Louise Deschâtelets : Louise Leblanc
 Julie Deslauriers : Caroline Béliveau
 Bruce Dinsmore : Simon Campbell
 Daniel Dô : Jean Phan
 Anne Dorval : Lise «Lola» Corbeil
 Jean-Emery Gagnon : Fred Côté
 René Gagnon : Benoit
 Claude Gauthier : Charles Moreau
 Abeille Gélinas : Moon Shadow
 Patrick Labbé : Olivier
 Gilbert Lachance : Marc-André Dumoulin
 Jean-Marie Lapointe : Nicolas Chaumet
 Lucie Laurier : Caroline Béliveau
 Danielle Leduc : Vanessa Hashley
 Guillaume Lemay-Thivierge : Corneille
 Francine Morand : Jeannine Gervais
 Cédric Noël : Étienne Dumas
 Widemir Normil : Georges Magloire
 Patricia Paquin : Geneviève Lacoste
 Anik Pauzé : Fanny
 Marcia Pilote : Josiane Martineau
 Nathalie Rose : Alexandra Capuano
 Jasmin Roy : Mathias Bélanger
 Caroline St-Onge : Chloé Asselin
 Marie-Jo Thério : Laura Cyr
 Marie-Soleil Tougas : Roxanne
 Christophe Truffert : Arnaud
 Valérie Valois : Annick Senneville
 Stéphane Demers : Denis Lapierre

Production
 Written by Sylvie Payette
 Filmed by Jacques Payette (season 1), Marlène Lemire (seasons 2-7)

Episodes

 Season 1 = (32 Episodes of 20 to 25 minutes)
 Season 2 = (26 Episodes of 40 to 45 minutes)
 Season 3 = (26 Episodes of 40 to 45 minutes)
 Season 4 = (26 Episodes of 40 to 45 minutes)
 Season 5 = (26 Episodes of 40 to 45 minutes)
 Season 6 = (26 Episodes of 40 to 45 minutes)
 Season 7 = (26 Episodes of 40 to 45 minutes)

TVA (Canadian TV network) original programming
Téléromans
1989 Canadian television series debuts
1996 Canadian television series endings
1980s Canadian drama television series
1990s Canadian drama television series
Television shows set in Montreal
Television shows filmed in Montreal